Rachelle Vinberg (born August 27, 1998) is an American skateboarder and actress. She is best known for starring as Camille, a fictionalized version of herself, in the film Skate Kitchen and the TV series Betty inspired by the real group of female skaters she is a part of.

Early life and education 
Vinberg was born in Long Island, New York, to divorced parents, a Colombian mother and an American father. She has an older brother and a younger brother. As of 2018, Vinberg was a sophomore at Brooklyn College, where she was majoring in film.

Career

Skateboarding 
Vinberg learned to ollie the summer before she turned 12, taught by an older cousin. Vinberg continued learning tricks by watching YouTube and started skating with the boys in her neighborhood. Vinberg befriended Nina Moran over YouTube and the two started skating together in NYC. While in NYC, Vinberg and Moran met Crystal Moselle. Moselle shot a 13-minute film with Vinberg, Moran and several of their friends titled That One Day, which was then reworked and expanded into the feature film, Skate Kitchen.

Acting 
Vinberg was skating at LES Skatepark when a casting director approached her to appear in "A Perfect Day", a Samsung commercial directed by Cary Fukunaga. In 2018, Vinberg played Camille in Crystal Moselle's film Skate Kitchen. Vinberg stars in the HBO produced series Betty, based on Skate Kitchen.

Filmography

Film

Television

References

External links 

1998 births
American people of Colombian descent
American skateboarders
American sportswomen
Female skateboarders
Hispanic and Latino American actresses
Living people
21st-century American women